Lutaru Lalna (Hindi: लुटारू ललना, Dacoit Damsel or The Dacoit Girl) is a 1938 Indian Hindi-language action adventure film directed by Homi Wadia and produced by Wadia Movietone. The music was composed by Master Mohammed and Baldev Naik. The film starred Fearless Nadia, Boman Shroff, Sardar Mansoor, Sayani Atish and Sarita Devi.

Plot
Minister Durjan Singh (Sayani Atish) takes over the management of Ramnagar after the king's death. The king's daughter Indira (Fearless Nadia) has been studying abroad. On her return, she hears from Vimala (Sarita Devi) and her father the pious Saibaba (Sardar Mansoor) that Durjan Singh and his men are oppressing the poor. Durjan Singh's brother Randhir (Boman Shroff), the Army Commander, is kind-hearted and sympathises with them. Randhir and Indira are in love with each other. When Randhir opts to leave with Vimala and her father, Indira finds out the truth about Durjan Singh. She takes on the disguise of a dacoit wearing a mask and becomes Lutaru Lalna to help the victimised. She has the horse Punjab Ka Beta and two brothers Bhanu and Nanu who have the car Rolls-Royce Ki Beti, to help her in her efforts. Soon Durjan Singh is out to catch her. Following some lengthy action scenes, Durjan and his henchman Teesmar Khan are caught. Randhir eventually gets together with Indira.

Cast
 Fearless Nadia as Indira
 Boman Shroff as Randhir
 Sardar Mansoor as Saibaba
 Sarita Devi as Vimala
 Atish Sayani as Durjan
 Mithu Miya
 Master Mohammed
 Master Chhotu
 Minoo The Mystic

Music
The Freedom Movement was effectively showcased by composer Master Mohammed in the Wadia films. In Lutaru Lalna he wove in two songs with nationalistic lyrics "Jhandha Ooncha Rahe Hamaara" sung by Mohammed along with Sarita Devi and "Jug Jug Chamke Hind Ka Tara" sung by Sarita Devi. Mohammed had earlier composed patriotic songs for Veer Bharat (1934) and Jai Bharat (1936). The music was composed by Master Mohammed and Baldev Nayak with lyrics by Pandit Gyan Chander.

Song List

References

External links

1938 films
1930s Hindi-language films
Indian black-and-white films
Films directed by Homi Wadia
Indian action adventure films
1930s action adventure films
Hindi-language action adventure films